Akalla is a station in the Stockholm metro in the Akalla district of Stockholm. The station was opened on 5 June 1977 as the northern terminus of the extension of the Blue line from Hallonbergen. This is the final stop on Line 11 of the Blue Line.

As part of Art in the Stockholm metro project, the station features an ochre colored grotto. The work includes ceramic pictures
illustrating the ideals, daily life, leisure and work of all people, created by Birgit Ståhl-Nyberg in 1977.

References

External links

Images of Akalla

Blue line (Stockholm metro) stations
Railway stations opened in 1977
1977 establishments in Sweden